The Limon Correctional Facility is a Level IV, mixed-custody Colorado state prison for men, located in Limon, Lincoln County, Colorado, owned and operated by the Colorado Department of Corrections.  The facility opened in 1991, and houses a stated maximum of 960 prisoners.

Incidents  

Limon houses some of the state's most dangerous inmates.

  In 2001 42-year-old inmate David Alonzo slipped and fell in his cell, and was dead three days later from an infected arm injury.  
  In October 2002, inmate Edward Montour Jr. beat correctional officer Eric Autobee to death in the facility's kitchen.  
  On March 28, 2004, inmate Jeffrey Heird was stabbed to death multiple times by other inmates, two of whom were charged with the death penalty for the attack.
  On September 12, 2007, an inmate cut the throat of corrections officer Pam Kahanic with a box cutter knife.  Kahanic survived the attack and was back at work within six weeks.
  Inmate Joshua Edwards died of undisclosed causes in early June 2015; only at the end of August did autopsy results show that Edwards had been stabbed in the neck and strangled to death.

Notable inmates

Freddie Glenn - Murdered actor Kelsey Grammer's sister, Karen. Transferred to Colorado State Penitentiary.

References

Buildings and structures in Lincoln County, Colorado
Prisons in Colorado
1991 establishments in Colorado